Beaver City may refer to the following places in the United States:

Beaver City, Indiana
Beaver City, Nebraska
Beaver, Oklahoma formerly Beaver City

See also 
 Beaver (disambiguation)#Places
 Beaverton (disambiguation)
 Beavertown (disambiguation)
 Beaverville (disambiguation)